Gaby Roslin (born 12 July 1964) is an English television and radio presenter who rose to fame co-presenting The Big Breakfast on Channel 4 between 1992 and 1996. Roslin also presented the Children in Need charity telethons on the BBC between 1995 and 2004.

She presented the weekly The National Lottery Draws on Saturday evenings and co-presented the Channel 5 daytime programme The Saturday Show alongside Matt Allwright.

Early life 
Roslin, daughter of former BBC radio announcer Clive Roslin, was born and raised in London. Her family is Jewish. Her family is from Zimbabwe.

Career

Television 
Roslin first presented Hippo on the Superchannel and then Motormouth on ITV from 1989 until 1992. At the end of that show, she was approached by Planet 24 to present their new early-morning programme The Big Breakfast alongside Chris Evans on Channel 4. Evans left the show in 1994 and Roslin continued with his replacement, Mark Little, until 1996. In her last year on the show, she also fronted the National Egg Awareness Campaign. Following her departure, she hosted The Gaby Roslin Show for Channel 4.

Roslin presented Children in Need from 1995 until 2004. Other BBC presenting roles included The Real Holiday Show,
City Hospital, Watchdog Healthcheck, Whatever You Want and A Question of TV. She was one of several presenters for the BBC's 2000 Today, a 28-hour-long programme to see in the year 2000. She was the only presenter to stay on air for the duration. In 2002, Roslin briefly returned to breakfast television as a roving reporter for Breakfast.

In 2003, Roslin switched networks to Five (now Channel 5) where she co-hosted The Terry and Gaby Show with Terry Wogan. The magazine format could not compete with ITV's similar, long-established This Morning and the show ended after 200 episodes on 26 March 2004.

In 2004, Roslin teamed up with Terry Wogan to co-host the first edition of Eurovision – Making Your Mind Up, the revamped successor to A Song for Europe, the UK's long-running pre-selection show for the Eurovision Song Contest. In 2005, she was replaced by Natasha Kaplinsky.

She co-presented the daytime programme Solution Street with Ben Shephard. In February 2006, she took part in the BBC celebrity duet show Just the Two of Us, where she partnered ABC frontman Martin Fry.

Roslin frequently appeared on the ITV lifestyle programme This Morning as a newspaper reviewer, often starring with her former radio co-host Paul Ross.

From 2014 until 2016, she presented The National Lottery Draws live on BBC One. For three weeks in March 2014, Roslin presented a daily programme entitled Sport Relief's Top Dog on BBC Two.

In 2014, Roslin co-presented the third series of BBC One's Food Inspectors programme with Matt Allwright and Chris Hollins.

On 25 January 2015, Roslin took part in celebrity talent show Get Your Act Together. Since 2015, Roslin has been a regular stand-in presenter on the ITV Breakfast show Lorraine.

In October 2015, it was announced that Roslin would co-present The Saturday Show, a daytime programme she hosts alongside Matt Barbet for Channel 5. Barbet was replaced by Matt Allwright in July 2016. In 2018, she co-presented Shop Smart: Save Money with Fiona Phillips, a series for Channel 5.

Stage 
In 2004, Roslin appeared in a national tour of the Moira Buffini play Dinner. The following year she toured in a stage version of When Harry Met Sally..., and later in the year she sang and danced in the London stage production of Chicago.

Radio 
Roslin sat in for Alan Carr on BBC Radio 2 on 15 and 22 August 2009 with Patrick Kielty and joined Carr to present a Christmas edition of his show on 24 December 2009. She was also a regular stand-in for BBC London 94.9, covering on occasions for Vanessa Feltz and JoAnne Good. On 11 January 2010, Roslin permanently replaced Good as co-host (with Paul Ross) of the BBC London 94.9 breakfast show and remained until January 2013. She was given her own weekly Saturday show, live from noon until 2:00 pm, in January 2013. A year later, she was moved to an extended Sunday afternoon show. In October 2021 Roslin sat in for Chris Evans on the 'Chris Evans Breakfast Show' on Virgin Radio UK, alongside Ricky Wilson (of the Kaiser Chiefs).

Roslin currently presents Gaby's Talking Pictures, a panel show for BBC Radio 4, also featuring team captains Ellie Taylor and John Thomson. The series began in June 2018 for six programmes.

Personal life 
Roslin married musician Colin Peel in 1995; they divorced in 2004. They have a daughter, Libbi-Jack, who was born in 2001. In December 2006, Roslin had another daughter, Amelie, from her relationship with publisher boyfriend David Osmon. The couple became engaged in March 2012 and married in a Jewish ceremony on 22 June 2013.

Filmography 
Television

References

External links 
Official Twitter
Gaby Roslin (BBC Radio London)
Gaby's Talking Pictures (BBC Radio 4)

1964 births
Alumni of the Guildford School of Acting
English Jews
English television presenters
Living people
English radio presenters
People educated at King Alfred School, London